A Light Never Goes Out is a 2022 Hong Kong drama film produced by Saville Chan and directed by Anastasia Tsang in her directorial debut. The film had its world premiere at the 2022 Tokyo International Film Festival. The film was the winner of 5th First Feature Film Initiative and received funding from the Film Development Fund.

Premise

Cast
 Sylvia Chang as Mei-heung
 Alma Kwok as young Mei-heung
 Simon Yam as Biu
Jacky Tong as young Biu
 Cecilia Choi as Rainbow
 Henick Chou as Leo

Production
A Light Never Goes Out is the feature debut of Anastasia Tsang, who graduated from Sorbonne University's film department. The film is produced by The Way We Dance'''s Saville Chan and reunites Sylvia Chang with Simon Yam, with whom she previously worked in the 1982 horror comedy He Lives by Night''.

Awards and nominations

References

External links
 
 

2022 films
2022 drama films
Hong Kong drama films
2020s Cantonese-language films
2022 directorial debut films
Winners of the First Feature Film Initiative